Billy Kay (born 1951) is a Scottish writer, broadcaster and language activist. He developed an early interest in language, studying English, French, German and Russian at Kilmarnock Academy and English literature at the University of Edinburgh.

His study of the history and status of the Scots language, Scots: The Mither Tongue, his most notable work, was later adapted for a television series, and an audiobook, recorded after setting up a home studio during the COVID-19 lockdown. Kay thought that many people would not have heard ' how the language sounds' in major Scots literature such as Barbour's Brus, R.L. Stevenson's Thrawn Janet, works by MacDiarmid and Burns or the Border Ballads covered in his book: a sound version, he said, would 'fill a big gap' in people's 'knowledge and appreciation of a great tradition'.

Odyssey

Kay's popular radio series, Odyssey, broadcast by BBC Radio Scotland in 1979, was a ground-breaking work of oral history which captured the diverse experiences of men and women across Scotland, including migrants from Donegal, Kintyre fishermen, Lithuanians in Lanarkshire, Dundee jute workers, Shetland whalers, Tiree emigrants to Canada, and servicemen seeking to exercise their land rights on returning to Knoydart after the Second World War. The following year, Odyssey: Voices from Scotland’s Recent Past, a collection of material drawn from the first series, was published by Polygon Books.

Despite the success of the first Odyssey radio series, no money was forthcoming to make any further programmes.  Stewart Conn, BBC Scotland's Head of Drama, stepped in, attaching Kay to the drama department to ensure that the project survived. Three radio series of Odyssey were broadcast and a series was commissioned for television. Odyssey: Voices from Scotland's Recent Past: The Second Collection, based on material from the later series, was published by Polygon in 1982.

Kay drew on material on Dundee's female jute workers collected for the Odyssey series in writing Jute!, which was broadcast as a dramatised documentary directed by Marylin Ireland.

Knee Deep in Claret

Knee Deep in Claret: A Celebration of Wine and Scotland, a collaboration with Cailean Maclean published by Mainstream in 1984, used the theme of Scotland's relationship with wine to explore aspects of Scottish culture from the 13th to the 20th centuries. A television programme based on the book was broadcast in the same year.

Bibliography
 Made in Scotland (contributor), Carcanet, 1974, 
 Odyssey: Voices from Scotland's Recent Past (editor), Polygon, 1980, 
 Odyssey: Voices from Scotland's Recent Past - the Second Collection (editor), Polygon, 1982, 
 Knee Deep in Claret: A Celebration of Wine and Scotland (with Cailean Maclean), Mainstream, 1983, 
 Scots: The Mither Tongue, Mainstream, 1986, 
 The Dundee Book: An Anthology of Living in the City (editor), Mainstream, 1990
 The New Makars (contributor), Mercat Press, 1991
 The Scots Map and Guide, MMA Maps, 1993
 A Tongue in Yer Heid (contributor), B & W Publishing, 1994, 
 Scotland and Ulster (contributor), Mercat Press, 1994, 
 Mak it New (contributor), Mercat Press, 1995, 
 The Complete Odyssey: Voices from Scotland's Recent Past (editor), Polygon, 1996, 
 The Scottish World: A Journey into the Scottish Diaspora, Mainstream, 2006
 Scotland and the Easter Rising: Fresh Perspectives on 1916 (contributor), Luath Press, 
 audiobook: Scots: The Mither Tongue Audible 2021

Prizes and awards
1973   Grierson Verse Prize (University of Edinburgh)
1974/75 Slom Prize for writing in Scots
1989   New York Radio Festival Silver Medal   (radio series)   The Scots of Ulster
1992   New York Radio Festival Bronze Medal   (radio series)   The Road and the Miles
1994   Sloan Prize - University of St Andrews   (radio play)   Lucky's Strike
1994   Wine Guild Houghton Award   (radio programme)   Fresche Fragrant Clairettis
1995   Heritage Society Award
1996   Wines of France Award   Knee Deep in Claret: A Celebration of Wine and Scotland
2019   Mark Twain Award
2019   Scots Media Person of the Year

See also
Scots language

References

External links 

 (audiobook) Scots: The Mither Tongue

Further reading
 Smith, Graham R. (1985), "A Profile of Billy Kay", in Parker, Geoff (ed.), Cencrastus No. 20, Spring 1985, pp. 2 – 7, 

1951 births
Living people
Scots language activists
Scottish non-fiction writers
Alumni of the University of Edinburgh
Scottish radio people
People from East Ayrshire